Rogo is a Local Government Area in Kano State, Nigeria. Its headquarter is in the town of Rogo.

It has an area of 802 km and a population of 227,742 (2006 census) and it is bordering Karaye and Kiru Local Governments from East, Makarfi Local Government in Kaduna State from the South, Danja and Kafur Local Governments in Katsina State from the West and the North respectively. 
Rogo Local Government has 10 political Wards, Which Includes:
Beli, 
Falgore, 
Fulatan, 
Gwangwan, 
Jajaye, 
Rogo-Ruma, 
Rogo-Sabon-Gari, 
Ruwan Bago, 
Zarewa and
Zoza Ward.
The postal code of the area is 704.

References

Local Government Areas in Kano State